Michelle Amato is an American vocalist.

She trained at the University of Miami's School of Music. She has toured or recorded with Quincy Jones, Jon Secada, Liza Minnelli, Al Green, Sandi Patty, Jon Hendricks, Donna Summer, Michael McDonald, Celia Cruz, and Rita Marley. She has been a featured soloist with the Memphis Symphony and the South Florida Pops.

She performed with Yanni during the 2003–2004 Ethnicity tour and her featured solo work can be heard on that album. She also toured with him during the 2005 Yanni Live! tour and appears on the resulting live concert film Yanni Live! The Concert Event. Amato is on the jazz faculty at the University of North Florida.

Discography
 I'm All Smiles (2006)

With The Palm Beach Society Orchestra
 The Palm Beach Society Orchestra: When You're Smiling (Arbors)

External links
Official site

American jazz singers
American women jazz singers
Living people
Year of birth missing (living people)
University of Miami Frost School of Music alumni
University of North Florida faculty
American women academics
21st-century American women